Cecil Birch was a British film director of the silent era. He directed more than a hundred short and feature films. He directed the 1915 hit melodrama Paula for Holmfirth Films.

Selected filmography
 Paula (1915)

References

Bibliography
 Low, Rachael. History of the British Film, 1914-1918. Routledge, 2005.

External links

Year of birth unknown
Year of death unknown
British film directors